Chamraua Assembly constituency is one of the 403 constituencies of the Uttar Pradesh Legislative Assembly, India. It is a part of the Rampur district and one of the five assembly constituencies in the Rampur Lok Sabha constituency. First election in this assembly constituency was held in 2008 after "Delimitation of Parliamentary and Assembly Constituencies Order, 2008" was passed in the year 2008. The constituency is assigned identification number 35.

Wards / Areas
Extent of Chamraua Assembly constituency is KC Matkhera of Suar Tehsil; KCs Saidnagar & Chamraua of Rampur Tehsil.

Members of the Legislative Assembly

Election results

2022

2017

2012
16th Vidhan Sabha: 2012 General Elections 

Source:

See also
Government of Uttar Pradesh
List of Vidhan Sabha constituencies of Uttar Pradesh
Rampur district
Rampur Lok Sabha constituency
Sixteenth Legislative Assembly of Uttar Pradesh
Uttar Pradesh
Uttar Pradesh Legislative Assembly

References

External links
 

Assembly constituencies of Uttar Pradesh
Rampur district
Constituencies established in 2008
2008 establishments in Uttar Pradesh